Shelby Ann Hogan (born May 10, 1998) is an American professional soccer player who plays as a goalkeeper for Portland Thorns FC of the National Women's Soccer League (NWSL).

College career
Hogan played for the Providence Friars women's soccer team from 2016 to 2019. She initially planned to return to the team in 2020 but instead turned professional.

Club career
In February 2021, Hogan signed with NWSL club Portland Thorns FC. She made her friendly debut against fellow NWSL club Houston Dash in the 2021 Women's International Champions Cup. In the semi-final, Hogan saved three penalty kicks in the shootout to send the Thorns to the championship match.

International career
Hogan was a member of the United States women's national under-18 soccer team.

Honors
Portland Thorns FC
 NWSL Shield: 2021
 NWSL Challenge Cup: 2021
 International Champions Cup: 2021
 NWSL Championship: 2022

References

External links
 
 Player profile at Portland Thorns FC
 Providence profile

1998 births
Living people
American women's soccer players
Women's association football goalkeepers
Portland Thorns FC players
Providence Friars women's soccer players
National Women's Soccer League players